John George Augustus Prim (1821–1875) was an Irish journalist, newspaper editor, antiquary and archaeologist of the Victorian era.

Life
Prim was born in the city of Kilkenny to John Henry Prim, a lawyer and Johanna Anderson. He had three brothers and four sisters. Prim had eight children with Mary McCrea, the daughter of the founder of the Moderator, Abraham Denroche.  He was a reporter at the Kilkenny Moderator, and editor from 1855 to the end of his life. Since childhood he had a fascination with archeology and wrote accounts of the archaeological sites throughout County Kilkenny. He planned to write the history of the county. Prim had begun transcribing from medieval manuscripts, collecting Irish ballads, and also planned to publish the songs of the county. He had a relationship with Seán Ó Dálaigh and Séamus Ó Braonáin to collect songs in Irish in their areas.

Kilkenny Archaeological Society

The Royal Society of Antiquaries of Ireland was founded in 1849 as the Kilkenny Archaeological Society, by a group of young men with archaeological and historical interests who were based in the Kilkenny area. Prim and his cousin, James Graves, were the first two Honorary General Secretaries.  They had had an interest in Kilkenny antiquities from their youngest days, when they had rambled as far afield as Kilfane Church to see the famous tomb sculpture of Cantwell Fada.  Prim had begun transcribing from medieval manuscripts, while Graves had been making sketches of the ancient monasteries of the vicinity. In 1869 the society was granted a Royal Charter, and in 1890 it moved to Dublin, changing its name to the Royal Society of Antiquaries of Ireland, becoming in 1891, according to its Honorary Secretary Robert Cochrane, "not only the largest Antiquarian Society in Great Britain and Ireland, but also the largest in the world".

Works

The Department of Irish Folklore, University College Dublin, have his manuscripts and notes prepared for the history of County Kilkenny, and the papers relating to the history and genealogies of the old Kilkenny families. The songs he collected in Irish have been published by Dáithí  Ó hÓgáin. 45 of his essays were published in the society's magazine.

  by John G.A. Prim ; formerly attributed to Paris Anderson

References

Bibliography

Further reading

External links
 

1821 births
Irish newspaper editors
19th-century Irish writers
19th-century journalists
People from Kilkenny (city)
1875 deaths
19th-century Irish businesspeople
Members of Kilkenny Archaeological Society